Closure of  Edward Donovan s London Museum and Institute of Natural History founded in 1807.
Emperor Franz II of Austria finances an expedition to Brazil on the occasion of the wedding of his daughter Archduchess Leopoldina to the Portuguese crown prince, Dom Pedro of Alcantara Johann Natterer was the zoologist on the expedition and was accompanied by other naturalists including Johann Baptist von Spix and Carl Friedrich Philipp von Martius.
Death of Nikolaus Joseph von Jacquin
Stamford Raffles in The History of Java states that at this date 170 bird species were known from Java and specimens were in the museum of the East India Company
Philipp Jakob Cretzschmar founds the Senckenberg Natural History Society. 
Ongoing events
Louis Jean Pierre Vieillot publishes the description of  the red-throated bee-eater in the first issue of  Nouveau dictionnaire d'histoire naturelle, appliquée aux arts, à l'agriculture, à l'économie rurale et domestique, à la médecine . Other birds  described by Vieillot in this work in 1817  include  the tropical screech-owl, the white-throated bee-eater, the  black-faced woodswallow, the white-flanked antwren and  the collared sparrowhawk.

Birding and ornithology by year
1817 in science